Two ships of the French Navy have borne the name Turenne in honour of French military commander Henri de la Tour d'Auvergne, Vicomte de Turenne:
 , a 100-gun ship of the line
 , a 

French Navy ship names